Scrobipalpa ochrostigma is a moth in the family Gelechiidae. It was described by Oleksiy V. Bidzilya and Hou-Hun Li in 2010. It is found in the Chinese provinces of Gansu and Qinghai.

The forewings are light brown, the posterior margin black from the base to half the length and in the subapical area. There is a narrow black strip along the costal margin from the base to two-thirds. Ochreous spots are found at the base, at one-third and at two-thirds. The hindwings are grey. Adults are on wing in August.

Etymology
The species name refers to the wing pattern and is derived from Greek ochra (meaning ochreous) and stigma (meaning marks).

References

Scrobipalpa
Moths described in 2010